The Brown Bomber is a vintage American cocktail.

It is one of only a few cocktails to feature peanut liqueur, which is made by blending ground peanuts with a spirit, often rum.

The origin of the drink is unclear.  It may have been created in honor of Joe Louis, the African-American boxer and World Heavyweight Champion from 1937 to 1949, who was nicknamed "The Brown Bomber."

See also

 List of cocktails

References

Cocktails with liqueur